Pelican Blood may refer to:

 Pelican Blood (2010 film), a British drama directed by Karl Golden
 Pelican Blood (2019 film), a German drama directed by 	Katrin Gebbe